Chalcides manueli, commonly known as Manuel's skink, is a species of lizard in the subfamily Scincinae of the family Scincidae.

Geographic range
C. manueli is endemic to Morocco.

Etymology
The specific name, manueli, is in honor of Albert Manuel of Rabat who helped Hediger to organize an expedition to Morocco.

Reproduction
Adult females of C. manueli give birth to live young.

Conservation status
C. manueli is somewhat rare throughout its distribution and is affected by deforestation, desertification, and overgrazing. It is likely that the species is in decline, and its range is severely fragmented.

References

Further reading
Hediger H (1935). "Herpetologische Beobachtungen in Marokko ". Verhandlungen der Naturforschenden Gesellschaft in Basel 46: 1-49. (Chalcides ocellatus manueli, new subspecies, p. 20). (in German).

Chalcides
Endemic fauna of Morocco
Reptiles described in 1935
Reptiles of North Africa
Taxa named by Heini Hediger